Lessingham is a village and a civil parish in the English county of Norfolk. The village is 16.3 south-east of Cromer, 17.6 miles north-east of Norwich and 136 miles north-east of London. The village lies 9 miles south-east of the town of North Walsham. The nearest railway station is at Worstead for the Bittern Line which runs between Sheringham, Cromer and Norwich. The nearest airport is Norwich International Airport. The parish also includes the village of Eccles-on-Sea and the hamlet of Hempstead.

The village has a history stretching back for centuries, but not much documentation survives. The name Lessingham derives from the 'homestead of the Leofsige's people'

The Community
Lessingham is a very active community making the most of its smart well-kept village hall.

The Parish Church

The parish church of Lessingham is called All Saints. The nave and chancel are as one and have a thatched roof. The church tower dates from the later part of the 13th century, although the windows in the belfry date from the 14th century. The font is from the 13th century, is constructed from Purbeck marble and is octagonal in shape. The village also has a Methodist Church which is situated on the parish boundary between Lessingham and the nearby village of Ingham.

The Village Pub
The village pub is called the Star Inn and is on Star Hill. The main feature of this traditional village pub is the huge inglenook fireplace with wood-burning stove which is alight during the winter months. The Inn is a free house and has a restaurant.

External links

A Chronology of Medieval Lessingham
All Saints Church

References

Villages in Norfolk
Civil parishes in Norfolk
North Norfolk